John Whitelaw may refer to:

John Whitelaw (footballer), player in the 1947 Scottish League Cup Final (October)
John Whitelaw (general, born 1894), Australian major general
John Whitelaw (general, born 1921), Australian major general, son of the above
John Whitelaw (harpsichord), American harpsichordist

See also
Whitelaw (surname)